The 2022 VTV Awards (Vietnamese: Ấn tượng VTV 2022) is a ceremony honouring the outstanding achievement in television on the Vietnam Television (VTV) network from August 2021 to the end of 2022. This year, all activities for the award ceremony had not been launched until the 52nd anniversary of VTV establishment on September 7. It was announced that the ceremony is officially moved to January 1, produced as a New Year show from now on.

Unlike last year, there are 12 award categories instead of 11. Two categories per week with 10 nominees of each will be revealed from September 7 to October 12. After that, the Voting Round 1 will start in order to pick out the Top 5. The nominated list will be cut down to Top 3 before the winner was crowned.

Winners and nominees
(Top 3 are listed first with the winners denoted in bold)

Presenters/Awarders

Special performances

References

External links

List of television programmes broadcast by Vietnam Television (VTV)

2022 television awards
VTV Awards
2022 in Vietnamese television
January 2023 events in Vietnam